The Lafayette Public Library (LPL) is the public library system serving Lafayette Parish, Louisiana.

History
The Lafayette Municipal Library was created by the Louisiana state government in 1942. On August 6, 1946, its doors officially opened for public use. On January 29, 1973, doors opened to the new location of the main library branch in downtown Lafayette (it remains there today). In 2002, parish voters approved a $40 million bond issue that would not only renovate the main library, but would also build four new regional branch libraries to serve the north, south, east, and west regions of the parish. As of 2019, all four of these regional locations have been built and opened to the public.

Branches
At present, there are nine library locations. Four are within the city of Lafayette, and five branches are in the rest of the parish.

References

External links
 Lafayette Public Library website

Education in Lafayette, Louisiana
Education in Lafayette Parish, Louisiana